WFLS may refer to:

 WFLS-FM, a radio station in Fredericksburg, Virginia.
 Wuhan Foreign Languages School, a secondary school in China.